The East London Democratic Association (ELDA) was founded in January 1837 by George Julian Harney in opposition to the LWMA, later supported by James Bronterre O'Brien and Feargus O'Connor. In April 1838 ELDA was reconstituted as the London Democratic Association (LDA) with an eight-point resolution covering the Charter and more. Closely allied with the northern Chartists, by the end of 1838, the LDA had branches meeting in public houses within the City, Tower Hamlets and Southwark in addition to the regular meeting held at the Trades Hall, Bethnal Green.

During its active period, the LDA attracted the largest membership of any early metropolitan Chartist organisation (a little over 3,000 members). Prominent members of the LDA included Harney, Charles Neesom and William Cardo.

References

External links
Objects of the London Democratic Association
Feargus O'Connor & The Chartists - UK Parliament Living Heritage

Chartism
History of social movements
Political movements
1837 establishments in England
19th century in London